"Lift Every Voice and Sing" is a hymn with lyrics by James Weldon Johnson (1871–1938) and set to music by his brother, J. Rosamond Johnson (1873–1954). Written from the context of African Americans in the late 19th century, the hymn is a prayer of thanksgiving as well as a prayer for faithfulness and freedom, with imagery that evokes the biblical Exodus from slavery to the freedom of the "promised land."

After its first recitation in 1900, "Lift Every Voice and Sing" was communally sung within Black American communities, while the NAACP began to promote the hymn as a "Negro national anthem" in 1917 (with the term "Black national anthem" similarly used in the present day). It has been featured in 42 different Christian hymnals, and it has also been performed by various African American singers and musicians. Its prominence has increased since 2020 following the George Floyd protests; in 2021, Jim Clyburn sponsored a bill proposing that "Lift Every Voice and Sing" be designated as the "national hymn" of the United States.

History
James Weldon Johnson, Chair of the Florida Baptist Academy in Jacksonville, Florida, had sought to write a poem in commemoration of Abraham Lincoln's birthday. However, amid the ongoing civil rights movement, Johnson decided to write a poem which was themed around the struggles of African Americans following the Reconstruction era (including the passage of Jim Crow laws in the South). "Lift Every Voice and Sing" was first recited by a group of 500 students in 1900. His brother J. Rosamond Johnson would later set the poem to music.

After the Great Fire of 1901, the Johnsons moved to New York City to pursue a career on Broadway. In the years that followed, "Lift Every Voice and Sing" was sung within Black communities; Johnson wrote that "the school children of Jacksonville kept singing it; they went off to other schools and sang it; they became teachers and taught it to other children. Within twenty years it was being sung over the South and in some other parts of the country."

Recognition 
A sculpture by Augusta Savage named after the song was exhibited at 
the 1939 New York World's Fair, taking the form of a choir of children shaped into a harp. Savage was the only Black woman commissioned for the Fair, and the sculpture (which was retitled "The Harp" by organizers) was also sold as miniature replicas and on postcards during the event. Like other temporary installations, the sculpture was destroyed at the close of the fair.

As the "Black national anthem" 
In 1919, the National Association for the Advancement of Colored People (NAACP) dubbed "Lift Every Voice and Sing" the "Negro national anthem", for its power in voicing a cry for liberation and affirmation for African American people. James Weldon Johnson would be appointed to serve as the NAACP's first executive secretary the following year. It has similarly been referred to as "the Black national anthem".

The use of the term "the Black national anthem" in reference to "Lift Every Voice and Sing" has been criticized. Timothy Askew, an associate professor at the historically Black Clark Atlanta University, argued that the use of the term "Black national anthem" could incorrectly implicate a desire of separatism by Black communities, that the lyrics of the hymn do not overtly refer to any specific race (which has inspired people to perform it outside African American communities), and "identity should be developed by the individual himself, not by a group of people who think they know what is best for you." Some Conservative commentators have similarly criticized performances and references to "Lift Every Voice and Sing" as the "Black national anthem" as separatist and diminishing to "The Star-Spangled Banner" as the national anthem of the United States.

In response to Askew's remarks, the NAACP's then-senior vice president of advocacy and policy Hilary O. Shelton told CNN that the hymn "was adopted and welcomed by a very interracial group, and it speaks of hope in being full first-class citizens in our society", used in conjunction with the U.S. national anthem or the Pledge of Allegiance during public events, "It is evident in our actions as an organization and here in America it is evidence that we are about inclusion, not exclusion. To claim that we as African-Americans want to form a confederation or separate ourselves from white people because of one song is baffling to me."

In January 2021, Representative Jim Clyburn sponsored a bill, HR 301, proposing that "Lift Every Voice and Sing" be designated as the "national hymn" of the United States.

Notable references and performances
In 1923, the male gospel group Manhattan Harmony Four recorded the hymn as "Lift Every Voice and Sing (National Negro Anthem)". It was added to the National Recording Registry in 2016.

In Maya Angelou's 1969 autobiography, I Know Why the Caged Bird Sings, the hymn is sung by the audience and students at Maya's eighth-grade graduation ceremony, after a white school official dashes the educational aspirations of her classmates.

In 1972, Kim Weston sang the hymn as the opening number for the Wattstax Festival at the Coliseum in Los Angeles. This performance was included in the film Wattstax which was produced by Wolper Films. The musical direction and recording were both overseen by Stax Records engineer Terry Manning.

In 1975, James Brown quoted a lyric from the hymn as part of his performance of the U.S. national anthem before the Muhammad Ali vs. Chuck Wepner boxing match.

In 1990, singer Melba Moore released a modern rendition of the hymn, which she recorded with the assistance of other singers, including R&B artists Stephanie Mills, Freddie Jackson, Anita Baker, Dionne Warwick, Bobby Brown, Stevie Wonder, Jeffrey Osborne, and Howard Hewett; and gospel artists BeBe & CeCe Winans, Take 6, and The Clark Sisters, after which, "Lift Every Voice and Sing" was entered into the Congressional Record by Del. Walter Fauntroy (D-DC). It was also added to the National Recording Registry in 2016.

In 2008, jazz singer Rene Marie was asked to sing the national anthem at a civic event in Denver, Colorado, where she caused a controversy by substituting the words of "Lift Every Voice and Sing" into the song. This arrangement of the words of "Lift Every Voice and Sing" with the melody of "The Star-Spangled Banner" became part of the titular suite on her 2011 CD release, The Voice of My Beautiful Country.

On January 20, 2009, the Rev. Joseph Lowery, a civil rights movement leader who co-founded and is a former president of the Southern Christian Leadership Conference, used a near-verbatim recitation of the hymn's third stanza to begin his benediction at the inauguration ceremony for President Barack Obama.

Jon Batiste, bandleader of the late-night talk show The Late Show with Stephen Colbert, has occasionally worked "Lift Every Voice and Sing" into the music which is played by his band Stay Human when the program hosts a Black guest; he stated that the hymn "connects us to the history of all the people who we stand on the shoulders of—who have marched and fought and died for the freedoms we enjoy and that we’re trying to improve upon".

On September 24, 2016, the hymn was sung by mezzo-soprano Denyce Graves and chorus at the conclusion of the opening ceremonies of the National Museum of African American History and Culture, at which Obama delivered the keynote address.

On October 19, 2017, when white supremacist leader Richard Spencer spoke at the University of Florida, the university's carillon played "Lift Every Voice and Sing" to convey a message of unity.

On April 14, 2018, "Lift Every Voice and Sing" was sung by Beyoncé during her headlining appearance at the Coachella Valley Music and Arts Festival.

In May 2018, the Tabernacle Choir performed "Lift Every Voice and Sing" during an edition of Music & the Spoken Word attended by members of the NAACP, who were in Salt Lake City for a national leadership meeting.

Prominence since the George Floyd protests 
In mid-2020, "Lift Every Voice and Sing" began to receive wider public attention amid nationwide protests over the police murder of George Floyd: it was sung during demonstrations and other events which were held in solidarity. Presidential candidate Joe Biden referenced the hymn in his action plan for addressing perceived racial disparities in the United States, which was titled "Lift Every Voice: The Biden Plan for Black America". On June 19, 2020, Google featured a Juneteenth-themed animation on its home page, set to a spoken word rendition of the hymn's first verse by LeVar Burton. In 2021, Vanessa Williams sung "Lift Every Voice and Sing" on the PBS Independence Day special A Capitol Fourth, commemorating the recognition of Juneteenth as a federal holiday. On February 18, 2023, Russell Gunn's blues suite, "The Blues and Its People," the hymn was both the opening song and the finale in this ambitious composition. The work debuted at the historic Apollo Theater in Harlem.  

The hymn also began to be incorporated into sporting events: during NASCAR's 2020 Pocono 350, musicians Mike Phillips and West Byrd quoted "Lift Every Voice and Sing" as part of their rendition of "The Star-Spangled Banner", while the National Football League announced that "Lift Every Voice and Sing" would be played or performed as part of the pre-game ceremonies of all Week 1 games during the 2020 season. The decision came as part of a new social justice campaign being introduced by the NFL, stemming from the league's acknowledgements of the Black Lives Matter movement, and its handling of players taking a knee during the singing of the national anthem in order to protest against racial inequality and police brutality. The NFL's opening night kickoff game featured a filmed performance of the hymn by Alicia Keys at the Los Angeles Memorial Coliseum, which was later replayed as part of the pre-game show of Super Bowl LV on February 7, 2021. 

The NFL stated that it would again feature the hymn at Week 1 games and other "tentpole" events (including the NFL Draft and playoff games) during the 2021 season. Some African American fans who were interviewed by NBC News felt that the NFL's decision was "pandering" that would not have a material impact on the league's pursuits of social justice.

Lyrics

Certifications

References

External links
 
  – including "Lift Every Voice and Sing"
 , edited by Julian Bond and Sondra Kathryn Wilson
 NPR's Performance Today page on Black History Month 2003 – includes a link to a RealPlayer version of the song
 ''Chicago Sun-Times columnist Lynn Sweet, transcript of Rev. Lowery's Inauguration Benediction
  led by Alice Walker and Dr. Rudolph Byrd at Emory University
 

1899 poems
1900 songs
20th-century hymns
African-American culture
African-American poetry
American Christian hymns
American patriotic songs
American poems
Gospel songs
North American anthems
Patriotic hymns
Songs based on poems
United States National Recording Registry recordings
Works by James Weldon Johnson